Zafra ambonensis is a species of sea snail in the family Columbellidae, the dove snails.

References

ambonensis
Gastropods described in 2008